UW, U.W., Uw, or uw may refer to:

Universities

Canada
 University of Waterloo
 University of Windsor
 University of Winnipeg

United States
 University of Washington
 University of Wisconsin System
 University of Wisconsin–La Crosse
 University of Wisconsin–Madison
 University of Wisconsin–Milwaukee
 University of Wyoming

Other countries
 University of Warsaw, Poland
 University of Wuppertal, Germany
 University of Würzburg, Germany

Other uses
 uw (digraph)
 Uw, the international symbol for relative humidity
 Unconventional warfare
 Unconventional warfare (United States), a US-specific definition of unconventional warfare used by its Department of Defense
 Unia Wolnosci (Freedom Union), a Polish political party

See also
 WU (disambiguation)
 U of W (disambiguation)
 Uwu (disambiguation)